Gala may refer to:

Music
Gala (album), a 1990 album by the English alternative rock band Lush
Gala – The Collection, a 2016 album by Sarah Brightman
GALA Choruses, an association of LGBT choral groups
Gala, a 1986 album by The Walker Brothers

Organizations and brands
GALA (Gay and Lesbian Acceptance), a Missouri non-profit organization for LGBT individuals connected with the Community of Christ
Gala (supermarket), an Irish convenience store chain
Gala Coral Group, a betting shop and bingo hall operator based in the United Kingdom
Gala Inc., a Japanese holding company
Gala RFC, a rugby club in Galashiels, Scotland
Gala TV, a television channel
"Gala", a nickname of Turkish football club Galatasaray S.K.

People
Gala (king), king of the Massylii of eastern Numidia
Gala (singer), Italian singer/songwriter
Gala Dalí (1894-1982), wife of French poet Paul Éluard and Catalan painter Salvador Dalí
Gala Aleksić (born 1969), Serbian actress
Antonio Gala (born 1930), Spanish poet and novelist
Gabe Gala (born 1989), Nigerian-born Canadian soccer player
Rosa Gala (born 1995), Angolan basketball player

Places
Gala, Iran, a village in East Azerbaijan Province, Iran
Gala, Tibet, a village
Gala, Virginia, an unincorporated community in the United States
Puerto Gala, a hamlet in southern Chile
A contraction of Galashiels, a Border town in Scotland

Others
Gala (apple), a type of apple grown particularly in New Zealand
Gala (board game), a board game played in Thailand and Myanmar
Gala (festivity), a festival
Gala (film), a 1982 Canadian documentary film
Gala (literary prize), awarded by the Tbilisi City Assembly, Georgia
Gala (magazine), a French magazine
Gala (potato)
Gala (priests), the lamenting priests of the Sumerian goddess Inanna
Gala Brand, a fictional character of the James Bond novel Moonraker (did not appear in the film version)
Gala (γάλα), a Greek word meaning milk; see 
Swimming gala, an amateur swimming competition

See also
 Gala Group (disambiguation)
 Durham Miners' Gala, an annual gathering and labour festival held in Durham, England
 Galah, a cockatoo native to Australia
 Galla Placidia, Roman empress, daughter of Emperor Theodosius the Great
 Gela (disambiguation)